was a Japanese industrialist and philanthropist who founded Mayekawa Manufacturing Company in Tokyo, Japan in 1924.  A graduate of Japan's Waseda University, he also founded the all-male Dormitory Wakeijuku through his philanthropic work.

 1920: Graduated from Waseda University School of Science and Engineering
 1924: Founded Mayekawa Manufacturing Ltd.
Supplied imperial Japan with war supplies.
 1948: Councilor of Waseda University (Later trustee)
 1955: Established the Wakeijuku Foundation

External links 
 Mayekawa Japanese Site

1893 births
1986 deaths
20th-century Japanese businesspeople
Japanese philanthropists
Waseda University alumni
20th-century philanthropists